Antonio Pavonelli, O.F.M. Conv. (1602–1653) was a Roman Catholic prelate who served as Bishop of Venosa (1648–1653).

Biography
Antonio Pavonelli was born in Civitella del Tronto, Italy in 1602 and ordained a priest in the Order of Friars Minor Conventual.
On 18 May 1648, he was appointed during the papacy of Pope Innocent X as Bishop of Venosa.
On 24 May 1648, he was consecrated bishop by Ulderico Carpegna, Cardinal-Priest of Sant'Anastasia, and Giuseppe della Corgna, Bishop of Squillace, and Ranuccio Scotti Douglas, Bishop of Borgo San Donnino, serving as co-consecrators. 
He served as Bishop of Venosa until his death on 23 Sep 1653.

References

External links and additional sources
 (for Chronology of Bishops) 
 (for Chronology of Bishops) 

17th-century Italian Roman Catholic bishops
Bishops appointed by Pope Innocent X
1602 births
1653 deaths